Chen Gang (born 27 June 1976) was a former Chinese badminton player from Zhejiang. He started his career in badminton at the age of eight. In 1989, Chen entered the Zhejiang team, and was selected to join the national team in 1994. He was a former World Junior Champion in the boys' singles event in 1994, and Asian Champion in the men's singles event in 1998.

In 2007, he went to South Korea as an assistant to singles coach Li Mao. In November 2008, he joined as a coach in Polish national team until September 2009. In July 2018, he moved to France as a national singles coach.

Achievements

World Cup 
Men's singles

Asian Championships 
Men's singles

Mixed doubles

World Junior Championships 
Boys' singles

IBF World Grand Prix 
The World Badminton Grand Prix sanctioned by International Badminton Federation (IBF) since 1983.

Men's singles

Mixed doubles

IBF International 
Men's singles

Mixed doubles

References

External links 
 

1976 births
Living people
Sportspeople from Hangzhou
Badminton players from Zhejiang
Chinese male badminton players
Badminton players at the 1998 Asian Games
Asian Games silver medalists for China
Asian Games medalists in badminton
Medalists at the 1998 Asian Games
Chinese badminton coaches
21st-century Chinese people
20th-century Chinese people